Souk Tlet El Gharb is a small town and rural commune in Kénitra Province of the Rabat-Salé-Kénitra region of Morocco. At the time of the 2004 census, the commune had a total population of 22,416 people living in 3315 households.

References

Populated places in Kénitra Province
Rural communes of Rabat-Salé-Kénitra